The Proteolysis MAP (PMAP) is an integrated web resource focused on proteases.

Rationale
PMAP is to aid the protease researchers in reasoning about proteolytic networks and metabolic pathways.

History and funding
PMAP was originally created at the Burnham Institute for Medical Research, La Jolla, California.  In 2004 the National Institutes of Health (NIH) selected a team led by Jeffrey W. Smith, to establish the Center on Proteolytic Pathways (CPP).  As part of the NIH Roadmap for Biomedical research, the center develops technology to study the behavior of proteins and to disburse that knowledge to the scientific community at large.

Focal point
Proteases are a class of enzymes that regulate much of what happens in the human body, both inside the cell and out, by cleaving peptide bonds in proteins.  Through this activity, they govern the four essential cell functions: differentiation, motility, division and cell death — and activate important extracellular episodes, such as the biochemical cascade effect in blood clotting.  Simply stated, life could not exist without them. Extensive on-line classification system for proteases (also referred as peptidases) is deposited in the MEROPS database.

The goal
Proteolytic pathways, or proteolysis, are the series of events controlled by proteases that occur in response to specific stimuli.  In addition to the clotting of blood, the production of insulin can be viewed as a proteolytic pathway, as the activation, regulation and inhibition of that protein is the result of proteases reacting to changing glucose levels and triggering other proteases downstream.

Database content
PMAP integrates five databases.
ProteaseDB and SubstrateDB, are driven by an automated annotation pipeline that generates dynamic ‘Molecule Pages’, rich in molecular information. CutDB has information on more than 6,600 proteolytic events, and ProfileDB is dedicated to information of the substrate recognition specificity of proteases.  PathwayDB, just begun accumulation of metabolic pathways whose function can be dynamically modeled in a rule-based manner.  Hypothetical networks are inferred by semi-automated culling from the literature.  Additionally, protease software tools are available for the analysis of individual proteases and proteome-wide data sets.

Usage
Popular destinations in PMAP are Protease Molecule Pages and Substrate Molecule Pages. Protease Molecule Pages show recent news in PubMed literature of the protease, known proteolytic events, protein domain location and protein structure view, as well as a cross annotation in other bioinformatic databases section. Substrate Molecule Pages display protein domains and experimentally derived protease cut-sites for a given protein target of interest.

See also
 Cytoscape
 Computational genomics
 Metabolic network modelling
 Protein-protein interaction prediction

References

External links
 
 Official website
 Proteolysis Cut Site database - curated expert annotation from users
 Protease cut sites graphical interface
 Protease cutting predictor
 Merops - the peptidase database

Molecular biology
Biological databases
Bioinformatics software
Systems biology
Mathematical and theoretical biology
Protein domains
Protein families
Peripheral membrane proteins

Post-translational modification
Programmed cell death
Apoptosis